Rhipsalis baccifera, commonly known as the mistletoe cactus, is an epiphytic cactus which originates from Central and South America, the Caribbean, and Florida. This is the only cactus species naturally occurring outside the Americas. One hypothesis is that it was introduced to the Old World by migratory birds, long enough ago for the Old World populations to be regarded as distinct subspecies. An alternative hypothesis holds that the species initially crossed the Atlantic Ocean on European ships trading between South America and Africa, after which birds may have spread it more widely.

Taxonomy
The species shows considerable polymorphism and can be divided into numerous subspecies. Mesoamerican specimens are usually tetraploid and South American specimens are diploid. The genera currently assigned to the tribe Rhipsalideae (which include Hatiora, Lepismium, and Schlumbergera in addition to Rhipsalis) were subject to considerable confusion and disagreement prior to the clarification by Wilhelm Barthlott and Nigel Taylor in 1995.

Gallery

References

External links
 

baccifera
Pantropical flora
Epiphytes
Cacti of North America
Cacti of South America